Boundary Creek is a cross-border tributary of the St. Mary River, flowing through Alberta in Canada and Montana in the United States.

Boundary Creek was named for the fact it crosses the Canada–United States border.

See also
List of rivers of Alberta
List of rivers of Montana

References

Rivers of Montana
Rivers of Glacier County, Montana
Rivers of Alberta